Compucolor II is a character set developed by Compucolor Corporation for their Compucolor computers. These used a SMC CRT5027 video controller, a Japanese-produced version of the Texas Instruments TMS 9927, programmed to provide a screen format of 32 lines with 64 characters per line.

Character set 

� Not in Unicode, most are pieces designed to make 2x2 character large letters

References 

Character sets